Coki Beach is on the island of Saint Thomas, United States Virgin Islands, in the Caribbean.

Coki Beach is a white sand beach on the North East (Atlantic) side of the island Saint Thomas, adjacent to the Coral World Ocean Park. Coki is well known for snorkeling, and is generally considered the best shore snorkel on the island. The beach is a popular tourist site, and taxi service is frequent. Vendors sell a variety of goods, including food, drinks, and crafts, and offer services such as hair braiding. 
In 2011, a boardwalk and bathhouse were added to the beach.
There is also a dive center on the beach which rents snorkel and scuba diving gear and offers guided dives.

Gallery

References

External links
 

Beaches of the United States Virgin Islands
East End, Saint Thomas, U.S. Virgin Islands